The CEVRO Institute is a private university in Prague, Czech Republic, established in 2005 by CEVRO, a think-tank affiliated with the Civic Democratic Party (ODS).

History
The CEVRO Institute was established on 15 September 2005 by CEVRO, a think tank created in 1999 by ODS politician Ivan Langer. The institute's main goal is to provide cross-disciplinary education in the area of social sciences: law, public administration, economics, business, political science, international relations and security. The university's opening ceremony on 1 November 2006 was attended by Czech Prime Minister Mirek Topolánek. The central facility of the CEVRO Institute is a historic building in the centre of Prague.

As of 2020, the current president is economist Josef Šíma, and the chairman of the board of directors is Ivan Langer.

Academics
The school offers 12 academic programs, two of which are in English. 

Bachelor programs in Czech include: Political Science and International Relations; Public Administration in Practice; Law in Commercial Relations; Security Policy; and Social Services Management. In autumn 2020, the school launched an international B.A. program in Economics, Business, and Politics.

Master's programs in Czech include: Political Science; Public Administration; Public Administration/Security Studies; Commercial Law Relations; and Social Services Management in the European Context. In autumn 2016, the school launched a philosophy, politics and economics (PPE) M.A. program taught in English by faculty from Europe and the United States. 

The university also offers one MBA program, three MPA programs, and three LLM programs, as well as summer programs in cooperation with Florida State University and the Centre International de Formation Européenne.

The institute publishes New Perspectives on Political Economy, a semi-annual, bilingual, interdisciplinary journal. Its main focus is private property, market, and individual liberty, based mostly on the Austrian School.

Prague Conference on Political Economy 
The Prague Conference on Political Economy (PCPE), an interdisciplinary conference focusing on cross-disciplinary research in the tradition of Philosophy, politics and economics, PPE&L or the Austrian School of Economics, has taken place since 2005, with the CEVRO Institute as the main organiser since 2010. The event includes two memorial lectures, the Franz Cuhel Memorial Lecture and Friedrich von Wieser Memorial Lecture.

Franz Cuhel Memorial Prize recipients include: Jörg Guido Hülsmann (2005), Jesús Huerta de Soto (2006), Richard Ebeling (2007), Thomas DiLorenzo (2008), Hans-Hermann Hoppe (2009), Peter Boettke (2011), William White (2015), Benjamin Powell (2016), Jeffrey Tucker (2017), and Randall G. Holcombe (2019).

Friedrich von Wieser Memorial Prize recipients include: Robert Higgs (2006), Boudewijn Bouckaert (2007), Bruno Frey (2008), Richard Epstein (2010), Terry L. Anderson (2011), Michael Munger (2014), Mark Pennington (2016), Bruce Caldwell (2017), Leszek Balcerowicz (2018).

Notable people

Faculty
 Richard Vedder, director of the Center for College Affordability and Productivity, Emeritus professor of economics at Ohio University, and adjunct scholar at the American Enterprise Institute
 Michael Munger, professor of economics at Duke University and adjunct scholar at Cato Institute
 David Schmidtz, professor of Philosophy
 Benjamin Powell, director of the Free Market Institute at Texas Tech University and senior fellow at the Independent Institute
 Peter Boettke, professor of Economics and Philosophy at George Mason University; Director of the F.A. Hayek Program for Advanced Study in Philosophy, Politics, and Economics at the Mercatus Center
 Cyril Svoboda, former Czech deputy prime minister, Minister of Foreign Affairs, and head of the Christian and Democratic Union – Czechoslovak People's Party
 Boudewijn Bouckaert, professor of law, former Dean, Faculty of Law, University of Ghent
 Alexandr Vondra, former Czech minister, former Ambassador to the United States, former adviser to President Václav Havel
 Magdaléna Vášáryová, former Ambassador of Czechoslovakia in Austria (1990-1993) and ambassador of Slovakia in Poland (2000-2005)
 Tara Smith, professor of Philosophy
 Michael Žantovský, former Ambassador of the Czech Republic to the United Kingdom, as well as to Israel and the United States.

Alumni
 Pavel Bělobrádek, deputy prime minister of Science and Research in the cabinet of the Czech Republic
 Vít Jedlička, Czech politician, president self-declared libertarian micronation Liberland

References

External links
 CEVRO Institute Website
 Association Européenne des Facultés Libres Member Website
 CEVRO Website

Educational institutions established in 2005
Educational institutions in Prague
Universities in the Czech Republic
Civic Democratic Party (Czech Republic)
2005 establishments in the Czech Republic